Artio (Dea Artio in the Gallo-Roman religion) is a Celtic bear goddess. Evidence of her worship has notably been found at Bern in Switzerland. Her name is derived from the Gaulish word for 'bear', artos.

Name

The Gaulish theonym Artiō derives from the Celtic word for the 'bear', artos (cf. Old Irish art, Middle Welsh arth, Old Breton ard), itself from Proto-Indo-European *h₂ŕ̥tḱos ('bear'). A Celtic form reconstructed as *Arto-rix ('Bear-King') could be the source for the name Arthur, via a Latinized form *Artori(u)s. The Basque hartz ('bear') is also presumed to be a Celtic loanword.

Attestations
A bronze sculpture from the Muri statuette group, found near Bern in Switzerland, shows a large bear facing a woman seated in a chair, with a small tree behind the bear. The woman seems to hold fruit in her lap, perhaps feeding the bear. The sculpture has a large rectangular bronze base, which bears the inscription "Deae Artioni / Licinia Sabinilla" ("To the Goddess Artio" or "Artionis", "from Licinia Sabinilla"). If the name is Gaulish but the syntax is Latin, a dative Artioni would give an i-stem nominative *Artionis or an n-stem nominative *Artio. That would perhaps correspond to a Gaulish n-stem nominative *Artiu.

Other inscriptions to the goddess have been discovered in Daun (CIL 13, 4203), Weilerbach (CIL 13, 4113), Heddernheim (CIL 13, 7375 [4, p 125]), and Stockstadt (CIL 13, 11789).

Popular culture 
Artio is a playable character in the video game Smite. She comes from the Celtic pantheon and is a melee, magical guardian. She can freely transform between her human representation (druid stance) and her bear form (bear stance), both of which come with their own sets of abilities. Her kit mainly focuses on healing herself and her allies and locking down enemies in her druid stance and then outputting large amounts of damage with her bear stance.

References

Bibliography

 Corpus Inscriptionum Latinarum (CIL) vol XIII, Inscriptiones trium Galliarum et Germaniarum
 
 Deyts, Simone (1992) Images des Dieux de la Gaule. Paris: Editions Errance. .
 Green, Miranda (1992) Animals in Celtic Life and Myth. London: Routledge. 
 
 Wightman, E. M. (1970) Roman Trier and the Treveri London: Hart-Davis.

External links
 
 

Gaulish goddesses
Celtic goddesses
Animal goddesses
Treveri
Bear deities